Tom Clancy's Rainbow Six (often shortened to Rainbow Six) is a tactical first-person shooter video game franchise by Ubisoft, based on the novel Rainbow Six by American author Tom Clancy. Critically and commercially successful, the franchise revolves around a fictional international counterterrorist organization called Rainbow.

Setting 
Tom Clancy's Rainbow Six follows a secret multinational counterterrorist organization called "Rainbow". The series is set in the canon Tom Clancy's universe, the same universe shared by Tom Clancy's Splinter Cell and Tom Clancy's Ghost Recon.

Formed in 1999 by the world's military, law enforcement, and intelligence agencies to combat the post-Cold War global rise in terrorism, Rainbow consists of "operators" from nations and organizations worldwide, ranging from special forces soldiers and police tactical unit members to combat field experts and intelligence officers, trained and equipped to become the most capable counterterrorist operators in the world, able to effectively handle any terrorist attack, hostage rescue, or takedown that local authorities cannot. Rainbow is headquartered in Hereford, England, but has global jurisdiction and can base themselves at any intelligence agency's headquarters (such as Langley, Virginia) should their continued presence in a region be necessary.

Due to the sensitive nature of their operations, such as being deployed in multinational incidents or against threats possessing weapons of mass destruction, and to simply prevent terrorists from knowing of their existence, Rainbow operates in complete secrecy, with only the most senior government, military, and intelligence officials knowing they exist. Cover-ups are often conducted after Rainbow's deployments to disguise them as local police or military units, omit details that could alarm the public, or prevent the reporting of certain deployments.

The leader of Rainbow is designated "Rainbow Six" (or just "Six"), a reference to the American rank code for captain (O-6). The first Six was former U.S. Navy SEAL and CIA operations officer John Clark, who led the organization from its founding until his retirement. Since then, numerous individuals have led Rainbow, the most recent being Harry Pandey.

Though the Rainbow Six universe is generally grounded in reality and maintains its basic premise, recent installments and plot events partially depart from the series' established setting or Rainbow's traditional organizational policies, with Rainbow hosting a publicly-visible tactical competition, recruiting non-government or independent operators such as private military company "Nighthaven", or being deployed to defeat invading extraterrestrials.

Video games
The first game was developed by Red Storm Entertainment, while the novel was being written. Red Storm was later acquired by Ubisoft.

List of games

Notes

References

External links
Ubisoft Website

 
Ubisoft franchises
Video game franchises
Tom Clancy games
G. P. Putnam's Sons books